Santiago Lovell Jr. (19 January 1942 – 8 March 2002) was an Argentine boxer. He competed in the men's heavyweight event at the 1964 Summer Olympics.

References

1942 births
2002 deaths
Argentine male boxers
Olympic boxers of Argentina
Boxers at the 1964 Summer Olympics
Sportspeople from Avellaneda
Heavyweight boxers